Andrés Fabricio Romero (born 21 December 1989) is a retired Argentine football striker.

Career

Club
Romero made his first team debut in a 2–0 away defeat to Newell's Old Boys on 11 April 2008. In his second season with the club he scored his first goals for the club including 2 goals in a 5–0 win over Estudiantes de La Plata. Romero's playing time at Argentinos started to diminish since the appointment of Claudio Borghi as manager in June 2009. He was still part of the Argentinos Juniors squad that won the Clausura 2010 championship, although he only played in 2 of the club's 19 games during their championship winning campaign.

In 2012, Romero joined Brazilian club Criciúma and played at the club briefly before joining Náutico. In 2013, he joined his third Brazilian club Tombense. He was sent on loan to Montreal Impact in Major League Soccer for the 2013 season. In his first season with Montreal, Romero made 30 league appearances and scored 2 goals. He also helped the Canadian club win the 2013 Canadian Championship, scoring 1 goal in 4 matches.

On 5 January 2014, the Montreal Impact officially purchased Romero from Tombense. He departed the Impact following the 2017 season.

International
In January 2009 Romero was selected to join the Argentina under-20 squad for the 2009 South American Youth Championship in Venezuela, and featured in most of the games as a late substitute. Romero did start the final two matches, a tie versus Venezuela and a loss to Colombia.

Honours
Argentinos Juniors
 Argentine Primera División (1): Clausura 2010

Montreal Impact
Canadian Championship (2): 2013, 2014

References

External links
 

1989 births
Living people
Sportspeople from Córdoba Province, Argentina
Argentine footballers
Association football forwards
Argentinos Juniors footballers
Criciúma Esporte Clube players
Clube Náutico Capibaribe players
Tombense Futebol Clube players
CF Montréal players
Argentine Primera División players
Campeonato Brasileiro Série A players
Major League Soccer players
Argentine expatriate footballers
Argentine expatriate sportspeople in Brazil
Argentine expatriate sportspeople in Canada
Expatriate footballers in Brazil
Expatriate soccer players in Canada
Argentina youth international footballers